Ernest Williams may refer to:

Ernest Calvin Williams (1887–1940), United States Marine Corps officer
Ernest Williams (conductor) (1881–1947), American band conductor
Ernest Williams (footballer) (1882–1943), English footballer
Ernest Edward Williams (1914–1998), American herpetologist
Ernest Edwin Williams (1866–1935), Welsh journalist, author and barrister
Ernest S. Williams (minister) (1885–1981), General Superintendent of the Assemblies of God